James O'Connor (born 20 June 1997) is an Irish Fianna Fáil politician who has been a Teachta Dála (TD) for the Cork East constituency since the 2020 general election.

He is the youngest member of the 33rd Dáil.

He was a member of Cork County Council from 2019 to 2020, representing the Midleton-Youghal local electoral area.

References

External links
James O'Connor's page on the Fianna Fáil website

1997 births
Living people
Members of the 33rd Dáil
Fianna Fáil TDs
Local councillors in County Cork